(1540? – August 10, 1590) was a Japanese samurai, who was the son of Hōjō Ujiyasu and lord of Hachiōji Castle in what is now Tokyo.

In 1568, Ujiteru defended Takiyama castle from Takeda Shingen. Later in 1569, Ujiteru and his brother Hojo Ujikuni commanded a major force at the Battle of Mimasetoge, where they unsuccessfully attempted to prevent Takeda Shingen from withdrawing to his home province of Kai after besieging the Hōjō's core castle at Odawara.

later in Siege of Odawara (1590) against Hideyoshi, Ujiteru left only 1,300 men behind at Hachiōji Castle when he went to help lift the Odawara castle, which had been surrounded by Toyotomi Hideyoshi. Shortly thereafter, on June 23, 1590, more of Hideyoshi's forces, numbering 30,000 and led by Maeda Toshiie and Uesugi Kagekatsu, arrived to take the castle, which fell in just one day. 
After the Hōjō were defeated in the Siege of Odawara, Ujiteru was forced to commit seppuku along with his brother Ujimasa.

The grave of Hojo Ujiteru  exists in two places: one located in Odawara city and another located at the site of Hachioji castle.

References

Turnbull, Stephen (1998). The Samurai Sourcebook. London: Cassell & Co.

1590 deaths
Go-Hōjō clan
Suicides by seppuku
Forced suicides
Year of birth uncertain